The 90th Infantry Division ("Tough 'Ombres") was a unit of the United States Army that served in World War I and World War II.
Its lineage is carried on by the 90th Sustainment Brigade.

World War I
Activated: August 1917.
Overseas: June 1918.
Major Operations: St. Mihiel, Meuse-Argonne.
Casualties: Total-7,549 (KIA-1,091; WIA-6,458).
Commanders: Maj. Gen. Henry T. Allen (25 August 1917), Brig. Gen. Joseph A. Gaston (23 November 1917), Brig. Gen. William Johnston Jr. (27 December 1917), Maj. Gen. Henry T. Allen (1 March 1918), Brig. Gen. Joseph P. O'Neil (24 November 1918), Maj. Gen. Charles H. Martin (30 December 1918).
Returned to U.S. and inactivated: June 1919.

Order of battle

 Headquarters, 90th Division
 179th Infantry Brigade
 357th Infantry Regiment
 358th Infantry Regiment
 344th Machine Gun Battalion
 180th Infantry Brigade
 359th Infantry Regiment
 360th Infantry Regiment
 345th Machine Gun Battalion
 165th Field Artillery Brigade
 343rd Field Artillery Regiment (75 mm)
 344th Field Artillery Regiment (75 mm)
 345th Field Artillery Regiment (155 mm)
 315th Trench Mortar Battery
 343rd Machine Gun Battalion 
 315th Engineer Regiment
 315th Medical Regiment
 315th Field Signal Battalion
 Headquarters Troop, 90th Division
 315th Train Headquarters and Military Police
 315th Ammunition Train
 315th Supply Train
 315th Engineer Train
 315th Sanitary Train
 357th, 358th, 359th, and 360th Ambulance Companies and Field Hospitals

Interwar period

The division was reconstituted in the Organized Reserve on 24 June 1921 and assigned to the state of Texas. The headquarters was organized on 8 August 1921.

World War II
Ordered into active military service: 25 March 1942 at Camp Barkley, Texas.
Overseas: 23 March 1944.
Distinguished Unit Citations: 5.
Campaigns: Normandy, Northern France, Ardennes-Alsace, Rhineland, Central Europe
Awards: MH-4 ; DSC-54 ; DSM-4 ; SS-1,418 ; LM-19; DFC-4 ; SM-55 ; BSM-6,140 ; AM-121.
Commanders: Maj. Gen. Henry Terrell Jr. (March 1942 – January 1944), Brig. Gen. Jay W. MacKelvie (5 April 1944), Maj. Gen. Eugene M. Landrum (13 June 1944), Maj. Gen. Raymond S. McLain (30 July 1944), Maj. Gen. James A. Van Fleet (15 October 1944), Maj. Gen. Lowell W. Rooks (22 January 1945), Maj. Gen. Herbert L. Earnest (2 March 1945).
Assistant Division Commanders: Brig. Gen. Charles W. Ryder (March − May 1942), Brig. Gen. Alan W. Jones (1942−1943), Brig. Gen. Samuel Tankersley Williams (February 1943 − July 1944), Brig. Gen. William G. Weaver (July − November 1944), Brig. Gen. Joseph M. Tully
Artillery Commanders: George D. Shea (July 1942 – September 1943)
Returned to U.S.: 16 December 1945.
Inactivated: 27 December 1945 at Camp Myles Standish, Massachusetts.

Order of battle
 Headquarters, 90th Infantry Division
 357th Infantry Regiment
 358th Infantry Regiment
 359th Infantry Regiment
 Headquarters and Headquarters Battery, 90th Infantry Division Artillery
 343rd Field Artillery Battalion (105 mm)
 344th Field Artillery Battalion (105 mm)
 345th Field Artillery Battalion (155 mm)
 915th Field Artillery Battalion (105 mm)
 315th Engineer Combat Battalion
 315th Medical Battalion
 90th Cavalry Reconnaissance Troop (Mechanized)
 Headquarters, Special Troops, 90th Infantry Division
 Headquarters Company, 90th Infantry Division
 790th Ordnance Light Maintenance Company
 90th Quartermaster Company
 90th Signal Company
 Military Police Platoon
 Band
 90th Counterintelligence Corps Detachment

Combat chronicle
The 90th Infantry Division landed in England, 5 April 1944, and trained from 10 April to 4 June.

First elements of the division saw action on D-Day, 6 June, on Utah Beach, Normandy, the remainder entering combat 10 June, cutting across the Merderet River to take Pont l'Abbe in heavy fighting. After defensive action along the river Douve, the division attacked to clear the Foret de Mont-Castre (Hill 122), clearing it by 11 July, in spite of fierce resistance. In this action the Division suffered 5000 killed, wounded, or captured, one of the highest casualty rates suffered in WW II. An attack on the island of Saint-Germain-sur-Sèves on 23 July failed so the 90th bypassed it and took Périers on 27 July.

On 12 August, the division drove across the Sarthe River, north and east of Le Mans, and took part in the closing of the Falaise Gap, by reaching 1st Polish Armored Division in Chambois, 19 August.

It then raced across France, through Verdun, 6 September, to participate in the siege of Metz, 14 September – 19 November, capturing Maizières-lès-Metz, 30 October, and crossing the Moselle River at Kœnigsmacker, 9 November. Elements of the 90th Infantry assaulted and captured the German-held Fort de Koenigsmacker 9–12 November.

On 6 December 1944, the division pushed across the Saar River and established a bridgehead north of Saarlautern (present-day Saarlouis), 6–18 December, but with the outbreak of Gerd von Rundstedt's (Army Group A) drive, the Battle of the Bulge, withdrew to the west bank on 19 December, and went on the defensive until 5 January 1945, when it shifted to the scene of the Ardennes struggle, having been relieved along the Saar River by the 94th Infantry Division. It drove across the Our River, near Oberhausen, 29 January, to establish and expand a bridgehead. On 19 February, the division smashed through Siegfried Line fortifications to the Prüm River.

After a short rest, the 90th continued across the Moselle River to take Mainz, 22 March, and crossed the rivers Rhine, the Main, and the Werra in rapid succession. Pursuit continued to the Czech border, 18 April 1945, and into the Sudetes mountain range. The division was en route to Prague when they came upon the remaining 1500 emaciated prisoners left behind by the SS at Flossenbürg concentration camp. Today, a memorial wall at the former camp honors the 90th as the liberators of Flossenbürg concentration camp. A week later, word came that the war in Europe ended on 8 May 1945. On that same day, Erich Hartmann, the highest-scoring fighter ace in history, along with a squadron of the elite Jagdgeschwader 52 fighter wing (the highest-scoring fighter wing in history), surrendered to the 90th.

Casualties
Total battle casualties: 19,200
Killed in action: 3,342
Wounded in action: 14,386
Missing in action: 287
Prisoner of war: 1,185

Assignments in ETO
5 March 1944: Third Army.
23 March 1944: Third Army, but attached to First Army.
27 March 1944: VII Corps.
19 June 1944: VIII Corps.
30 July 1944: Third Army, but attached to First Army.
1 August 1944: XV Corps, Third Army, 12th Army Group.
17 August 1944: Third Army, 12th Army Group, but attached to V Corps, First Army.
25 August 1944: XV Corps, Third Army, 12th Army Group.
26 August 1944: XX Corps
6 January 1945: III Corps.
26 January 1945: VIII Corps.
12 March 1945: XII Corps.

General
Nickname: Tough 'Ombres; during World War I, the division was called the Texas-Oklahoma Division, represented by the T and O on the shoulder patch.
Shoulder patch: A khaki-colored square on which is superimposed a red letter "T", the lower part of which bisects the letter "O", also in red.

Notable personnel
 Major General Terry de la Mesa Allen Sr. served with this division as a battalion commander in 1918 and later served in World War II
 James A. Baker Jr.
 William H. H. Morris Jr.

References

Combat Chronicles: "90th Infantry Division". – The Army Almanac: A Book of Facts Concerning the Army of the United States. U.S. Government Printing Office. – 1950. – pp. 510–592. Hosted at the United States Army Center of Military History.
Wythe, George. A History of the 90th Division. New York, N.Y.: 90th division Association, 1920.

External links

 Tough 'Ombres! The Story of the 90th Infantry Division
 Official Website of the Tough 'Ombres
 Order of Battle 90Th ID European Center of Military History
 90th Infantry Division Preservation Group – Living History & Reenactment Articles 
 "Tough 'Ombres!", Company "B", 359th Regiment, 90th Infantry Division Living History & Reenactment – Tough 'Ombres!
 Raw Combat Footage of the 90th Infantry Division – Combat Reels

Infantry divisions of the United States Army
Infantry Division, U.S. 090
United States Army divisions of World War I
Infantry divisions of the United States Army in World War II
Military units and formations established in 1917